A list of British films released in 1932.

A-K

L-Z

Documentaries and serials

Short films and featurettes

See also
1932 in British music
1932 in British television
1932 in film
1932 in the United Kingdom

References

External links

1932
Films
British
1930s in British cinema